The Isle of Man cricket team toured Guernsey from 18 to 22 August 2020 to play various age-group and senior matches, including a single Twenty20 International (T20I), against the hosts. The tour included various matches played between the under-13, under-15 and under-17 teams of each nation, including 20, 45 and 50-over formats.

The senior teams played a three-match T20 series, with the first of those matches being an official T20I played on 21 August at College Field in Saint Peter Port. This was the first official T20I match played by Isle of Man since the International Cricket Council's decision to grant T20I status to all matches played between Associate Members from 1 January 2019. Guernsey won the one-off T20I match by eight wickets. The two remaining matches of the series between the senior sides took place the following day at King George V Sports Ground, Castel, without official T20I status. Guernsey won the series 3–0.

Squads

T20 series
The teams played a three-match series; only the first match had T20I status.

1st T20 (Only T20I)

2nd T20

3rd T20

Notes

References

External links
 Series home at ESPN Cricinfo

Associate international cricket competitions in 2020
International cricket competitions in Guernsey
Isle of Man in international cricket